Arthur Edward "Artie" Butler (December 18, 1887 – October 7, 1984) was an American infielder in Major League Baseball. He played for the Boston Rustlers, Pittsburgh Pirates, and St. Louis Cardinals.

He was the last living teammate of Hall of Fame pitcher Cy Young.

References

External links

Art Butler at Find a Grave

Major League Baseball infielders
Boston Rustlers players
Pittsburgh Pirates players
St. Louis Cardinals players
Fall River Indians players
St. Paul Saints (AA) players
Fall River Brienies players
Worcester Busters players
Milwaukee Brewers (minor league) players
Kansas City Blues (baseball) players
Buffalo Bisons (minor league) players
Bridgeport Bears (baseball) players
Albany Senators players
Providence Grays (minor league) players
Hartford Senators players
Baseball players from Massachusetts
Sportspeople from Fall River, Massachusetts
1887 births
1984 deaths